Doris Pitkin Buck (January 3, 1898 – December 4, 1980) was an American science fiction author.

Born in New York City, she graduated from Bryn Mawr College in 1920 and Columbia University with a master's degree in 1925.  She was a stage actress before marrying Richard Buck.  She taught English at Ohio State University and was a founding member of the Science Fiction Writers of America.

She published numerous science fiction stories and poems, many of them in The Magazine of Fantasy & Science Fiction. Buck started published at fifty-four with her first story, "Aunt Agatha" in the October 1952 Magazine of Fantasy and Science Fiction. Her story "The Little Blue Weeds of Spring" from the June 1966 issue was a nominee on the first ballot for the Nebula Award for Best Short Story.  Her story "Why They Mobbed the White House" appeared in Damon Knight's anthology Orbit 3 (1968).  Her story "The Giberel" appeared in Robert Silverberg's anthology New Dimensions 1 (1971) and reappeared in Lloyd Biggle, Jr.'s Nebula Award Stories 7 (1972).  Her story "Cacophony in Pink and Ochre" is one of the stories slated to appear in Harlan Ellison's unpublished anthology The Last Dangerous Visions.

Buck died at age 82 of a pulmonary embolism.  Her final publication was the poem "Travel Tip", published posthumously in the June 1981 issue of F&SF.

References

External links
 
 Doris Pitkin Buck at The Encyclopedia of Science Fiction

1898 births
1980 deaths
20th-century American poets
American science fiction writers
American women short story writers
American women poets
Bryn Mawr College alumni
Columbia University alumni
Ohio State University faculty
Writers from New York City
Women science fiction and fantasy writers
American women novelists
20th-century American women writers
20th-century American novelists
20th-century American short story writers
Novelists from New York (state)
Novelists from Ohio
American women academics